André Schuiteman (born 1960, Amsterdam) is a Dutch botanist in the Royal Botanic Gardens, Kew in London, United Kingdom, where he is the Research Leader for Asia in Plant Identification and Naming. Schuitemania, a genus of orchid, was named in his honour.

Publications 

. 2014. Dendrobieae (p.p.) and Aeridinae (p.p.) En: Pridgeon, A.M., Cribb, V, Chase, M.W. & Rasmussen, F.N. (Eds.). Genera Orchidacearum. Vol. 6. Epidendroideae (Parte 3) Oxford Univ. Press
. 2013. Vanilla atropogon, a new species from Vietnam. Orchideen. 1-1; 10-16
. 2011. Nocturne for an unknown pollinator: first description of a night-flowering orchid (Bulbophyllum nocturnum). Botanical Journal of the Linnean Society 167 ( 3): 344–350 doi 10.1111/j.1095-8339.2011.01183.x 2011. The strange case of Dendrobium aphyllum. Orchid Review 119: 104-110
. 2008. An annotated checklist of the Orchidaceae of Laos. Nordic Journal of Botany 26: 257-314
. 2004. Epiphytism and pollinator specialization: drivers for orchid diversity? Phil. Trans. R. Soc. Lond. B 359, 1523–1535

References

1960 births
Living people
Botanists active in Kew Gardens
20th-century Dutch botanists
21st-century Dutch botanists
Leiden University alumni
Scientists from Amsterdam